A fehirde (Old Norse: féhirði) was a term used in the Norwegian middle ages, equaliant of a "tax minister" or "royal treasurer". Under the rule of Haakon V of Norway in the early 14th century, the country was divided into five fehirdsler. These were Oslo, Tønsberg, Bergen, Trondheim and Båhus, each under the administration of a separate fehirde.

Sources
Caplex, fehirde
Ordnett.no, fehirde

Medieval Norway